Events from the year 1755 in Russia

Incumbents
 Monarch – Elizabeth I

Events

  The founding of Moscow State University

Births

Deaths

 
 
 

 Anastasija Trubetskaya, courtier (born 1700)

References

1755 in Russia
Years of the 18th century in the Russian Empire